The Appalachian League is a collegiate summer baseball league in the United States. From 1911 to 2020, it was part of affiliated Minor League Baseball. A league champion is determined at the end of each season. Champions have been determined by postseason playoffs or winning the regular season pennant. Currently, the two teams with the highest winning percentages in each of two divisions, East and West, are eligible for the postseason. These teams compete in a single champsionship game to determine a league champion.

League champions
Score and finalist information is only presented when postseason play occurred. The lack of this information indicates a declared league champion.

Championship wins by team
Active Appalachian League teams appear in bold.

Notes
 Middlesboro and Morristown were in first place when the league disbanded on June 17

References
Specific

General

Champions
Appalachian
Appalachian League champions
Appalachian League